This is a list of awards and nominations received by Silverchair. The Australian rock band formed in 1994 in Newcastle, New South Wales, consisting of Daniel Johns (vocals and guitar), Chris Joannou (bass guitar) and Ben Gillies (drums). One of the most popular Australian bands, as of December 2013 Silverchair held the record for the most ARIA Music Awards won, with 21. The band has also won multiple awards in the Australian music industry including the APRA and Jack Awards. Silverchair has won a number of categories from notable music magazines. The band has scored 15 songs in the Triple J Hottest 100.

ARIA Awards

The ARIA Music Awards have been held annually in Australia since their inception in 1987. Silverchair holds the record for the most nominations by a group, with 49, and the most wins by any artist, with 21. Their breakthrough year was in 1995, winning five out of nine nominated awards, including Best New Talent, and Breakthrough Artist for both album and single categories.

All five of their studio albums were nominated for Album of the Year, but they failed to win until nominated for their fifth album in 2007. The band won Single of the Year and Highest Selling Single twice in 1995 and 2007, and won Best Group and Best Rock Album twice in 2002 and 2007. They have also won the award for Best Cover Art twice in 1997 and 2002, and Engineer of the Year thrice in 1998, 1999 and 2002. Silverchair's most successful year was in 2007, winning six awards.

APRA Awards
The APRA Awards are held annually since 1982, presented by the Australasian Performing Right Association. Silverchair has won six awards from ten nominations. After the 2008 APRA Awards, Daniel Johns became the first artist to win the Songwriter of the Year award three times.

EG Awards / Music Victoria Awards
The EG Awards (known as Music Victoria Awards since 2013) are an annual awards night celebrating Victorian music. They commenced in 2006.

|-
|rowspan="2"| EG Awards of 2007
| Young Modern
| Best Album
| 
|-
| "Straight Lines"
| Best Song
| 
|-

Jack Awards
The Jack Awards are sponsored by Tennessee whiskey company Jack Daniel's, and are held annually since 2004. Silverchair was nominated for the first time in 2007, and won two awards from four nominations.

MTV Video Music Awards
Silverchair was awarded twice for MTV International Viewers' Choice Award, presented by MTV. MTV Australia later inaugurated the MTV Australia Video Music Awards, commencing in 2005. Silverchair was nominated for the first time in 2007 for two awards and won the newly introduced Video Vanguard Award.

Triple J Hottest 100
The annual music poll Triple J Hottest 100 was inaugurated in 1989 and is based on the public votes of Australian youth radio station Triple J listeners. Silverchair has scored 14 songs in the Hot 100. Five songs by Silverchair entered the Top 100 in 2002, which at the time was the most number of entries in a single Hot 100 chart for an Australian artist.

In 1998, a poll was held known as the "Hottest 100 of all time", where the song choices were not limited to a particular year. "Tomorrow" was placed 59th on the list and "Abuse Me" was placed 83rd.

Awards from magazines
Silverchair placed as the winner or runner-up for several categories in the April 2000 edition of the Australian Rolling Stone magazine, as polled by the readers of the magazine. Also in 2000, they placed highly in several categories in Drum Media and Chart magazines for their work in 1999.

Other awards and nominations
Silverchair won in the 1996 World Music Awards for World's Highest Selling Australian Group. After performing "Ana's Song (Open Fire)", Silverchair was awarded for Best Video for the song at Viva's Comet Awards, Cologne, Germany in 1999.

The group won Metal Edge magazine's 1995 Readers' Choice Award for Best New Band.

In 2002, the album Diorama was voted as Album of the Year by the listeners of the Australian youth radio station Triple J. Later in 2005, Triple J inaugurated the J Award, a single award given to the Australian Album of the Year. Silverchair were nominated were nominated in 2007 for Young Modern but lost out to The Panics - Cruel Guards

In addition, Channel V's Oz Artist of the Year is voted by the Australian public, and is awarded to the artist on the same day as the annual ARIA Award presentation events. Since its inauguration in 1997, Silverchair has won the Artist of the Year award for six consecutive years, from 1997 to 2002. Silverchair was also nominated for the award in 2007, but lost to Evermore.

References
Notes

A. ^ The number of awards indicate the number of times Silverchair has appeared in any Triple J Hottest 100 chart.

Citations

Awards
Lists of awards received by Australian musician
Lists of awards received by musical group